Gonzalo Torrente Ballester (13 June 1910 – 27 January 1999) was a Spanish  writer  associated with the Generation of '36 movement.

Life
He was born in Serantes, Ferrol, Galicia, and received his first education there, subsequently attending the universities of Santiago de Compostela and Oviedo.

Although primarily a novelist, he also published journalism, essays, and plays. His career as a writer began in Oviedo, but developed largely in Madrid.

Before the outbreak of the Spanish civil war, he traveled to Paris with the intention of writing his doctoral thesis and there he was surprised by the coup d'etat of July 18, 1936. After hesitating, he returned to Spain in October to be with his family.  From the bus that was taking him home, he saw the bodies of victims of the repression in the ditches. His father exclaimed by way of greeting: "Don't you know that many of your friends have been shot?". He followed the recommendation of a priest he trusted and joined the Falange. His first novel, Javier Mariño, appeared in 1943, and he continued to publish novels almost until his death, receiving major prizes for some of them.

Despite his affiliation to the Falangists, from 1939, when he returned to Santiago to take up a university post, he increasingly distanced himself from the party. He joined in protests in favour of striking Asturian miners in 1962, and was expelled from his teaching post at the university as a result. In the mid-1960s he had a number of problems with government censors.

He left Spain for a post at the University at Albany, State University of New York in 1966, and remained there until 1973 as the University's first distinguished professor. In 1975 he moved to the city of Salamanca, where he remained until his death. After his return to Spain, he was increasingly celebrated: In 1975 he was elected member of the Real Academia Española, and was awarded the premier Spanish literary prize, the Cervantes Prize, in 1985.

Immediately after his death, the Fundación Gonzalo Torrente Ballester was set up to protect, study and disseminate his work.

List of novels

 Javier Mariño (1943)
 El golpe de estado de Guadalupe Limón (1946)
 Ifigenia (1950)
 Los Gozos y Las Sombras: El Señor llega (1957) - , Donde da la vuelta el aire (1960), La Pascua triste (1962). Novel prize of the Fundación Juan March
 Don Juan (1963)
 Off-Side (1968)
 La Saga/Fuga de J.B. (1972) - Critics' Prize and City of Barcelona Prize
 Fragmentos de Apocalipsis (1977)
 La isla de los jacintos cortados (1980) - National Literature Prize
 Dafne y ensueños (1982)
 Quizá nos lleve el viento al infinito (1984)
 La princesa durmiente va a la escuela (1985)
 La rosa de los vientos (1985)
 Yo no soy yo, evidentemente (1987)
 Filomeno, a mi pesar (1988) - Planet Prize
 Crónica del rey pasmado (1989)
 Las islas extraordinarias (1991)
 La muerte del decano (1992)
 La novela de Pepe Ansúrez (1994)
 La boda de Chon Recalde (1995)
 Los años indecisos (1997)
 Doménica (1999)

Screenplays
 Night Arrival (1949)
 Surcos (1951)
 Devil's Roundup (1952)
 Rebellion (1954)

See also 
University of Santiago de Compostela

References

External links

Official site  giving biographical and bibliographical material about Torrente Ballester and a good collection of images.

1910 births
1999 deaths
People from Ferrol, Spain
Writers from Galicia (Spain)
Members of the Royal Spanish Academy
Spanish people of the Spanish Civil War (National faction)
Premio Cervantes winners
Falangism
Spanish male writers
Spanish fascists
Spanish theatre critics
University at Albany, SUNY faculty
University of Oviedo alumni